Boana diabolica is a frog in the family Hylidae.  It is endemic to Brazil and French Guiana.

This frog has bright red coloration on the hidden parts of its legs and front and hind feet.

References

Boana
Amphibians of Brazil
Endemic fauna of Brazil
Amphibians of French Guiana
Endemic fauna of French Guiana
Amphibians described in 2016